The Gaon Album Chart is a record chart that ranks the best-selling albums and EPs in South Korea. It is part of the Gaon Music Chart which launched in February 2010. The data for the chart is compiled by the Ministry of Culture, Sports and Tourism and the Korean Music Content Industry Association based on weekly and monthly physical albums and digital sales by six major distributors: LOEN Entertainment, S.M. Entertainment, Sony Music Korea, Warner Music Korea, Universal Music and Mnet Media.

In 2010, there were 40 number one albums on the weekly chart. 2PM, and Girls' Generation topped the chart with three different albums each, more than other act. On the monthly chart, Girls' Generation had four number ones with three different albums, more than other act. Overall, Super Junior's Bonamana album was Gaon Album Chart best selling album of 2010, selling 200,193 copies. The second highest-selling album was Girls' Generation's Oh! which sold 197,934 copies; a repackaged version titled Run Devil Run sold 136,851 copies. Girls' Generation sold South Korea best-selling album of 2010 with 334,785 units sold for both albums.

Weekly chart

Monthly chart

Notes

References

External links 
 Gaon Album Chart - official homepage 

2010
Korea, South albums
2010 in South Korean music